Howard Alan Masur is an American mathematician who works on topology, geometry, and combinatorial group theory.

Biography 
Masur was an invited speaker at the 1994 International Congress of Mathematicians in Zürich. and is a fellow of the American Mathematical Society.

Along with Yair Minsky, Masur is one of the pioneers of the study of curve complex geometry. He also contributed to the understanding of the convergence of geodesic rays in Teichmüller theory.

Masur was a Ph.D. student of Albert Marden at the University of Minnesota-Minneapolis.

Awards and recognitions 
The Hubbard–Masur theorem is named after Masur and John H. Hubbard. In 2009, a conference of mathematicians honored Masur's 60th birthday in France.

Selected papers

References

Fellows of the American Mathematical Society
University of Illinois Chicago faculty
University of Chicago faculty
University of Minnesota alumni
Geometers
Group theorists
Living people
20th-century American mathematicians
21st-century American mathematicians
Year of birth missing (living people)